Paulina Kotfica (born 15 May 1986, in Szczecin) is a Polish professional triathlete and the Polish Championships 2010 bronze medalist.

In the seven years from 2004 to 2010, Paulina Kotfica took part in 35 ITU competitions and achieved 9 top ten positions.
In 2010, she achieved four top ten positions at (Premium) European Cups and the World University Championships in Valencia, where Kotfica placed 6th in the individual ranking and 1st in the team ranking together with Agnieszka Jerzyk and Anna Grzesiak.

In Poland Paulina Kotfica represents the club KS Biuro Podróż AS Szczecin.
In 2011, Kotfica will also represent the club EJOT in the German Bundesliga circuit.

ITU Competitions 
The following list is based upon the official ITU rankings and the athlete's ITU Profile Page.
Unless indicated otherwise, all competitions enumerated below are Olympic Distance Triathlons and belong to the Elite category.

BG = the sponsor British Gas · DNF = did not finish · DNS = did not start

External links
 Polish Triathlon Union in Polish

References

Polish female triathletes
Living people
1986 births
Sportspeople from Szczecin
European Games competitors for Poland
Triathletes at the 2015 European Games